IOE or IoE may refer to:

 IOE engine, a type of combustion engines
 Images of England, an online photographic record of all the listed buildings in England 
 International Organisation of Employers
 Institute of Education (Dublin)
 IOE, UCL's Faculty of Education and Society, University College London
 Institute of Engineering, Kathmandu, Nepal
 Internet of Everything, more often referred to as the Internet of Things
 Institutes of Eminence is a scheme of excellence for higher education institutes in India
 Industrial and Operations Engineering a specialization of Industrial engineering